Vyacheslav Paulavich Hleb (born 12 February 1983) is a Belarusian former footballer, who played as a midfielder or forward.

Club career
Hleb has had unsuccessful trials with Scottish Premier League sides Inverness CT in 2005 and Hearts. In the summer of 2008, Hleb was close to be transferred to Dutch side Roda JC but the clubs could not agree.

On 10 February 2009, Hleb signed a two-year contract with Chinese Super League side Shanghai Shenhua. He played 27 league games and scored seven goals in Season 2009 but when Miroslav Blažević was appointed manager in December 2009, he decided that Hleb was not part of his plans to try and turn Shanghai Shenhua into league title contenders.

On 12 August 2010, Hleb transferred to Shenzhen Ruby on a loan deal. In 2011, he played for Dinamo Minsk as well as for FSV Frankfurt.

On 7 September 2012, Kalloni FC from Football League (Greece) announced his transfer.

International career
Hleb was also an international for the Belarus national team.

International goals

Honours
MTZ-RIPO Minsk
 Belarusian Cup winner: 2007–08

Gomel
Belarusian Super Cup winner: 2012

Torpedo-BelAZ Zhodino
Belarusian Cup winner: 2015–16

Personal life
His older brother Alexander is also a footballer.

References

External links
 

1983 births
Living people
Footballers from Minsk
Belarusian footballers
Association football midfielders
Belarusian expatriate footballers
Belarus international footballers
Belarus under-21 international footballers
Belarus youth international footballers
Expatriate footballers in Germany
Expatriate footballers in Switzerland
Expatriate footballers in China
Expatriate footballers in Greece
Belarusian expatriate sportspeople in Germany
Belarusian expatriate sportspeople in Switzerland
Belarusian expatriate sportspeople in Greece
Belarusian expatriate sportspeople in China
Belarusian Premier League players
Bundesliga players
2. Bundesliga players
Chinese Super League players
Swiss Super League players
FC Dinamo-Juni Minsk players
VfB Stuttgart II players
Hamburger SV players
Grasshopper Club Zürich players
FC Partizan Minsk players
Shanghai Shenhua F.C. players
Shenzhen F.C. players
FC Dinamo Minsk players
FSV Frankfurt players
FC Gomel players
AEL Kalloni F.C. players
FC Torpedo-BelAZ Zhodino players
FC Krumkachy Minsk players
FC Neman Grodno players
FC Arsenal Dzerzhinsk players